The MicroDreams Foundation is an American non-profit organization founded by Gregory Casagrande in 2002 as a microfinance accelerator that helps small, growing micro-enterprise development organizations reach financial self-sufficiency. Over the past nine years, MicroDreams has provided substantial support to the SPBD microfinance network in all four of its branches in (Samoa, Tonga, Fiji, and the Solomon Islands) and has helped to scale up other young emerging partner microfinance institutions (MFIs) in Bolivia, Ecuador, and Peru. MicroDreams uses loans, loan guarantees, and technical assistance to help provide meaningful economic opportunities to the poorest members of society.

MicroDreams’ primary goal is to provide the global poor, in particular women, with the economic opportunity to empower them to work their way out of poverty. The non-profit provides financing to start-ups and Tier 3 microfinance institutions that otherwise would not be able to receive funding. Large microfinance investment vehicles and asset management firms tend to avoid providing funding to these types of microfinance institutions because they are considered too small and too risky to be a safe investment.

History
The MicroDreams Foundation, originally branded South Pacific Business Development-USA, was founded in 2002 by Gregory F. Casagrande as a U.S. 501(c)(3) non-profit organization to help fund the growth of South Pacific Business Development Foundation (Samoa), a microfinance institution tweaked to fit local needs that, as a start-up, found external investment hard to come by. SPBD (Samoa) gradually became financially sustainable with the help of several commercial entities to pay back start-up funding, and today is the largest microfinance provider in the country. MicroDreams has since expanded its focus and continues to serve as a microfinance accelerator for start-up microfinance institutions including the three additional branches of SPBD in other South Pacific countries.

Microenterprise development

Since its founding, MicroDreams has delivered approximately US$2,000,000 of financing to young, well-managed MEDOs (MicroEnterprise Development Organizations) in Bolivia, Ecuador, Peru, Tonga, Fiji, and the Solomon Islands. MicroDreams helped South Pacific Business Development expand into Tonga in 2009, Fiji in 2010, and the Solomon Islands in 2013.

MicroDreams monitors its MFI partners and ensures that they provide loans for underprivileged people to start their own businesses as well as proper training and mentoring to female microentrepreneurs. The partners also provide life insurance and savings accounts. The SPBD network encourages its members to use the proceeds gained from their microenterprises to make basic housing improvements and better provide education for their children. The MFI partners help to ensure the children of all members receive a proper education by providing financing to pay for school fees, school uniforms, and textbooks.

Tsunami
On September 29, 2009, Samoa was hit by a tsunami triggered by a submarine earthquake, the largest earthquake of the year. Aid came quickly to the hundreds of families devastated by the tsunami from the nearby Samoan Red Cross and the New Zealand police. From the U.S., MicroDreams provided direct aid and operational leadership to hundreds of families devastated by the tsunami. MicroDreams worked in cooperation with the United Nations Development Program (UNDP) and Mercy Corps, which channeled the funds it raised for the relief efforts in Samoa through the existing network of MicroDreams and SPBD. The relief and recovery efforts of MicroDreams and its partner microfinance institution were covered by the Samoa Observer.

Funding partners
MicroDreams has received funding from several charitable foundations practicing high impact philanthropy. Both the Mulago Foundation and Sam Morgan's Jasmine Social Investments have provided funding to MicroDreams. The funds are re-directed to MicroDreams' partner microfinance institutions in the field. In addition to providing loans and loan guarantees to partners in the South Pacific, MicroDreams also works closely with CreSud Spa and Oikocredit to do the same for its field partners in Latin America.

In January 2014, the New Zealand-based Snakk Media, contributed funding to MicroDreams in support of the SPBD networks' newest branches in Fiji and the Solomon Islands.

References

External links 
 The MicroDreams Foundation website

Non-profit organizations based in New Jersey